Liverpool Street bus station is located within Liverpool Street station and is next to the Broadgate shopping and office complex. It has been closed since 2017 until September 2019 to allow construction work on the adjacent Broadgate site redevelopment.

Layout
There are four stands at the station, named A, B, C and D. The waiting area is within the rail station on the top floor, just outside the exits to the bus stands. Buses use Sun Street to turn around and sometimes park there while not in use during off-peak hours.

See also
List of bus and coach stations in London

References

External links
 Buses from Liverpool Street - Transport for London

Bus stations in London
Transport in the City of London